The 1991 Grand Prix de Tennis de Toulouse was a men's tennis tournament played on indoor carpet courts in Toulouse, France that was part of the World Series of the 1991 ATP Tour. It was the tenth edition of the tournament and was held from 30 September until 6 October 1990. First-seeded Guy Forget won the singles title.

Finals

Singles

 Guy Forget defeated  Amos Mansdorf, 6–2, 7–6

Doubles

 Tom Nijssen /  Cyril Suk defeated  Jeremy Bates /  Kevin Curren, 4–6, 6–3, 7–6

References

External links
 ITF tournament edition details

Grand Prix de Tennis de Toulouse
Grand Prix de Tennis de Toulouse
Grand Prix de Tennis de Toulouse
Grand Prix de Tennis de Toulouse
Grand Prix de Tennis de Toulouse